The Best of Shakespear's Sister is a compilation album from British pop-rock band Shakespears Sister, released in November 2004. The compilation consists of a CD of greatest hits, rarities, and unreleased tracks, and a DVD of their music videos and live performances. The album gained notability for its inclusion of several tracks from the then-unreleased album, #3, which was only finally released six months later after a near decade-long delay.

Track listing

References 

2004 greatest hits albums
Shakespears Sister albums
Albums produced by Flood (producer)
Albums produced by Alan Moulder
2004 video albums
Music video compilation albums